Steensnæs is a Norwegian surname. Notable people with the surname include:

Einar Steensnæs (born 1942), Norwegian politician
Kjetil Steensnæs (born 1976), Norwegian musician

Norwegian-language surnames